Thalassodes quadraria is a species of moth of the family Geometridae first described by Achille Guenée in 1857. It is found in Africa south of the Sahara and in India and Sri Lanka.

Description
Its wingspan is about 38 mm. Hindwings with veins 3, 4 and 6, 7 stalked. Forewings with vein 11 from the cell. Forewings with veins 3, 4 stalked. Hindwings with angled outer margin. It is a bluish-green moth with reddish palpi and frons. Vertex of head white. Wings semihyaline, with numerous pale striae. Forewings with fulvous costa. Antemedial and postmedial indistinct pale straight oblique lines. Hindwings with indistinct postmedial line, produced to a point and angled at vein 3. Both wings with ochreous cilia at tips or wholly ochreous. Ventral side whitish.

Larval food plants include Ricinus communis, Mangifera indica, Rosa, Crotalaria verrucosa, Coffea arabica, Myrica aethiopica, Schinus molle, Zea mays, and Myrica serrate.

References

External links
 Vingerhoedt - Pictures of Thalassodes quadraria
 Live picture on Flickr
 The Interactions of Population Dynamics of Thalassodes quadraria and the Plant Community Struutureand Climate Factors in DinghuShan.
 Relationship between different host plants; potential growth and longevity of Thalassodes quadraria Gruen. (Lepidoptera: Geometridae) [1974]

Geometrinae
Moths of Cape Verde
Moths of the Comoros
Moths of Africa
Moths of Madagascar
Moths of Mauritius
Moths of Réunion
Moths of São Tomé and Príncipe
Moths of Seychelles
Moths described in 1857
Taxa named by Achille Guenée